The 2000–01 SK Rapid Wien season is the 103rd season in club history.

Squad statistics

Goal scorers

Fixtures and results

Bundesliga

League table

Cup

UEFA Cup

References

2000-01 Rapid Wien Season
Austrian football clubs 2000–01 season